Vinny Chapman (born 5 December 1967) is a former English  footballer who played as a defender.

References

1967 births
Living people
English footballers
Association football defenders
Rochdale A.F.C. players
Huddersfield Town A.F.C. players
English Football League players
Footballers from Newcastle upon Tyne